Today's Man is an album by saxophonist Charles McPherson which was recorded in 1973 and released on the Mainstream label.

Reception

The Allmusic site awarded the album 3 stars.

Track listing 
 "Charisma" (Charles McPherson) - 5:07  
 "Naima" (John Coltrane) - 6:20  
 "Invitation"  (Bronisław Kaper, Paul Francis Webster) - 3:15
 "Stranger in Paradise" (Alexander Borodin, Robert Wright, George Forrest) - 5:53     
 "Cheryl" (Charlie Parker) - 6:17  
 "Bell Bottoms (Ernie Wilkins)" - 4:43

Personnel 
Charles McPherson - alto saxophone
Frank Wess - flute, tenor saxophone (tracks 1-3)
Chris Woods - flute, baritone saxophone (tracks 1-3)
Cecil Bridgewater, Richard Williams - trumpet, flugelhorn (tracks 1-3)
Julius Watkins - French horn(tracks 1-3)
Garnett Brown - trombone (tracks 1-3)
Barry Harris - piano
Larry Evans - bass
Billy Higgins - drums
Ernie Wilkins - conductor, arranger (tracks 1-3)

References 

1973 albums
Charles McPherson (musician) albums
Mainstream Records albums
Albums produced by Bob Shad